Death Proof is the soundtrack to Death Proof, Quentin Tarantino's segment of 2007 film Grindhouse. It includes clips of dialogue from various scenes in the film.

Track listing

Extra tracks not on the Soundtrack album
 "Violenza Inattesa" — Ennio Morricone
 "Gangster Story" — Guido & Maurizio De Angelis
 "Italia a Mano Armata (main theme)" — Franco Micalizzi
 "La polizia sta a guardare (main theme)" — Stelvio Cipriani
 "Laisse Tomber Les Filles" (original, French version of "Chick Habit") — April March
 "Funky Fanfare" — Keith Mansfield
 "Twisted Nerve" — Bernard Hermann

Sales

See also
Planet Terror (soundtrack)

Notes

2007 soundtrack albums
Grindhouse (film)

de:Grindhouse (Film)#Soundtrack